H. C. Goonewardene, CCS was a Sri Lankan civil servant. He was the former Permanent Secretary of Ministry of Home Affairs.

He was educated at Royal College, Colombo and University College, Colombo and entered the  Ceylon Civil Service. Thereafter he served as Land Commissioner and Government Agent of several areas including Batticaloa.

His brother C. T. Goonewardene was the Surveyor General.

References

Sinhalese civil servants
Alumni of Royal College, Colombo
Alumni of the Ceylon University College
Permanent secretaries of Sri Lanka
Year of birth missing